Mbole may refer to:
the Mbole people
the Mbole–Enya languages
the Mbole language